Phaldut "Paul" Sharma, also known as Paul Sharma, is a UK-based actor and dancer. He is known for his roles in Gavin and Stacey as Achmed and Eastenders as AJ Ahmed .

Career

Television and film
Sharma played Vinnay Ramdas in Casualty and then Damon Lynch in 2011, Rajiv in comedy-drama Roger Roger and Paul in Meet the Magoons. He has also appeared in episodes of Life on Mars, Dalziel and Pascoe and the BBC daytime series Doctors. also appeared in one episode of Ultimate Force Series 4 Episode 3 "the dividing line".

Sharma was in the first episode of the UK comedy The Office, playing Sanj, and was Stacey Shipman's (Joanna Page) ex-fiancé, Achmed, in Gavin & Stacey. In 2009, Sharma appeared as Hindu nationalist Harish Dhillon in an episode of Spooks. In 2012, Sharma was cast in EastEnders as Masood Ahmed's (Nitin Ganatra) brother AJ, a regular character. He left the soap opera in 2014. He also appeared in episode six of Hunted.

In 2015, Sharma released I Gotta Be Me - a ten-part web comedy in which he plays Paul Shah - a semi-autobiographical character based on his experience as a Sammy Davis Junior tribute act. He also appeared as Leigh in episodes four and five of Cucumber. In 2019, he appeared as Tom, the father of Sophie who befriends the titular character in season 1 of Hanna.

In 2021, Sharma appeared as DCI Ram Sidhu in the fourth series of ITV drama Unforgotten.

Stage
Sharma played Sammy Davis Jr in the West End production of Rat Pack Confidential in 2003.

From September to October 2010, he appeared in Factory Theatre Company's Boiling Frogs at Southwark Playhouse, London.

References

External links
 

Living people
British people of Indo-Guyanese descent
Welsh male stage actors
Welsh male television actors
People from Newport, Wales
People educated at Bassaleg School
Alumni of the Guildford School of Acting
Male actors from London
Welsh male film actors
Guyanese Hindus
1981 births
British people of Indian descent